The Râoaia is a left tributary of the river Lăpuș in Maramureș County, Romania. It discharges into the Lăpuș in the town Lăpuș.

Tributaries

The following rivers are tributaries to the river Râoaia:

Left: Ciormotura
Right: Zâmbrița

References

Rivers of Romania
Rivers of Maramureș County